Widdern is a town in the district of Heilbronn, Baden-Württemberg, Germany. It is situated on the river Jagst, 24 km northeast of Heilbronn.

Mayors 
1995–2011: Michael Reinert
2011–2019: Jürgen Olma 
since 2019: Kevin Kopf

References

Heilbronn (district)